The Hamilton Building is a historic office building in downtown Portland, Oregon. It went through a renovation in 1977, and was listed on National Register of Historic Places in March of that year. It is the neighbor of the Dekum Building, a fellow NRHP listing on Third Avenue.

The building, completed in 1893, is an anomaly among its contemporaries. While many buildings built during the late 19th century were often ornate, the Hamilton building has little decoration. It is said that architects Whidden & Lewis designed a ground-breaking building, built decades ahead of later (and similar) trends in commercial architecture. Decoration comes in the form of granite-clad cast iron entry columns and cable mouldings, set against a Japanese-brick facade.

The Hamilton Building is 6 stories tall, and is named after Hamilton Corbett, son of Henry W. Corbett. It is also the first building in Portland designed in the Classical Revival style.

See also
Architecture of Portland, Oregon
National Register of Historic Places listings in Southwest Portland, Oregon

References

External links

 Hamilton Building (Emporis)

Buildings and structures in Portland, Oregon
National Register of Historic Places in Portland, Oregon
1893 establishments in Oregon
Buildings and structures completed in 1893
Buildings designated early commercial in the National Register of Historic Places
Southwest Portland, Oregon
Office buildings on the National Register of Historic Places